Pendleton is a civil parish in Ribble Valley, Lancashire, England.  It contains 18 listed buildings that are recorded in the National Heritage List for England.  Of these, one is at Grade II*, the middle grade, and the others are at Grade II, the lowest grade.  The parish contains the village of Pendleton, and is otherwise rural.  All the listed buildings are houses and associated structures, or farmhouses and farm buildings, either in the village, or in the surrounding area.

Key

Buildings

References

Citations

Sources

Lists of listed buildings in Lancashire
Buildings and structures in Ribble Valley